KCMX (880 kHz) was an AM radio station broadcasting a news/talk format. Licensed to Phoenix, Oregon, United States, the station served the Medford-Ashland area. The station was last owned by Stephens Media Group, through licensee SMG-Medford, LLC.

History
The station was issued an initial construction permit on October 12, 1960, as KMFR, for 1,000 watts daytime-only on 860 kHz. On October 2, 1961, the call letters were changed to KSHA, which was followed by additional call letter changes to KISD on July 21, 1980, back to KMFR on May 3, 1984, and to KTMT in 1992. In 1984 the station moved to 880 kHz.

Expanded band assignment
On March 17, 1997, the Federal Communications Commission (FCC) announced that 88 stations had been given permission to move to newly available "Expanded Band" transmitting frequencies, ranging from 1610 to 1700 kHz, with KTMT authorized to move from 880 to 1650 kHz. However, the station never procured the Construction Permit needed to implement the authorization, so the expanded band station was never built.

Later history
The station call letters were changed to KCMX on January 1, 1999.

Stephens Media Group acquired KCMX, along with 36 other Mapleton Communications stations, in 2019.

KCMX left the air January 10, 2023, due to the failure of its transmitter. Stephens Media Group elected to move the station's programming entirely to translator station K258DB (99.5 FM) and the third HD Radio subchannel of KAKT; the license was surrendered on March 13, 2023.

Local programming
KCMX simulcast KDOV The Dove's morning programs, Mornings On TheDove and Focus Today with Perry Atkinson from 6am to 9am before the Glenn Beck program.

Translator
KCMX also broadcast on the following FM translator:

References

External links
Official Website
FCC Station Search Details: DKCMX (Facility ID: 60314)
FCC History Cards for KCMX (covering 1959-1981 as KMFR / KSHA / KISD)

Defunct radio stations in the United States
Phoenix, Oregon
CMX
Radio stations established in 1962
Radio stations disestablished in 2023 
1962 establishments in Oregon
2023 disestablishments in Oregon
CMX